Flaminia Cinque (born 20 August 1964) is an English actress. She is based in London, England.

Her voice roles include Lillian Gopher and Merv Wombat in Gophers!, Flamingo in Tinga Tinga Tales and Ester in the children's animated television series Thomas & Friends.

Cinque, along with actor Vincenzo Nicoli, has appeared in The Knot, Leap Year, Holy Cannelloni, and Brothers of Italy.

Early life
Cinque was born in Cambridge, England on 20 August 1964. She studied acting at the Bristol Old Vic Theatre School.

Career
She began her acting career in 1989 after graduating from college.
Winner of the Peter Ackerman Comedy Prize in 1988 for her stage performances of Mae West in Happy as a Sandbag and Hermia in A Midsummer Night's Dream, she worked with Sir Peter Hall for the first of four times in Tennessee Williams' The Rose Tattoo in London's West End and took over the leading role when Julie Walters had to pull out of the production.

She has played the open air amphitheatre at Epidavros in Greece in Lysistrata and the New Victory Theatre, Broadway, New York in More Grimm Tales. She was invited to join the Comedy Store Players in 2000.

She was part of the original cast of David Hare's The Permanent Way at the National Theatre in London UK, which toured to Sydney, Australia and played Conchalla in the first UK production of Sam Shepard's The Late Henry Moss at the Almeida Theatre, in London, UK.

Her television appearances include Any Human Heart, Ultimate Force, The Ruth Rendell Mysteries, The Bill, EastEnders, Doctors and New Tricks.

Cinque played three characters in the program Casualty for 3 different episodes. She portrayed Rita in the BBC miniseries Man in an Orange Shirt.

Her film appearances include Mr. Bean's Holiday, Bridget Jones: The Edge of Reason, Show Dogs, What a Girl Wants, Leap Year and The Knot. She appeared in the BBC Radio 4 Program All the Young Dudes as Maria, which ran from 2001 to 2002.

Cinque appeared in the 2022 action film Accident Man: Hitman's Holiday as Mrs. Zuzzer, with Scott Adkins, and the 2011 action film  Attack the Block, with Jodie Whittaker, Nick Frost and newcomer John Boyega.
She also appeared as Mamma Rosa in the charming and hilarious comedy "Holy Cannelloni", written and directed by Carolina Giammetta.

She joined the voice cast of Thomas & Friends as the voice of Ester in the UK & US dubs, respectively. She also narrates books for the Live Streaming Service "Bookstreamz.com".

Personal life
Born in Cambridge, UK of Italian parents (from Brisighella in the Emilia-Romagna region in North East Italy and Sorrento near Naples), she is bilingual in English and Italian and resides in London, England with her partner Gerald Heward.  She also speaks French and Spanish.  From 1997, she was the London Correspondent/translator and presenter for the Bandini Committee (an outfit which awards rookie Formula 1 drivers in the name of the legendary F1 driver Lorenzo Bandini who lost his life at the Monte Carlo Grand Prix of 1967).

Filmography

Film

Television

Video games

References

External links

1964 births
English film actresses
English television actresses
English voice actresses
English stage actresses
English people of Italian descent
20th-century English actresses
21st-century English actresses
Alumni of Bristol Old Vic Theatre School
People from Cambridge
Living people